Pet culture refers to the culture revolving around the interaction of humans and pets.

Pet culture in the United States 
Modern day society has integrated animals into their everyday lives. Today, American families have said that their non-working, indoor animals are close enough to call them family. Many owners post photos and videos of their pets on social media to entertain other animal lovers. The relationship between sharing and watching has shown an increase in interest for pet owning. This increase in pet owning has impacted cat and dog populations within the animal community. Within mid-1960’s century America, their population has grown an impeccable amount compared to the human population. An average of 63% of American households have one pet, while 45% have multiple.  Increase in pets have impacted the increasing number of veterinarians. 

Before the 1900’s, ownership of a pet was restricted to certain social classes who had the income to care for it. With modern day technology and medicine, the average lifespan of pets has changed. Indoor cats, on average, will live up to 13-14 years. While indoor dogs, on average, will live up to 6-10 years. Pet-keeping can be cost heavy. Throughout the average life of a pet in the United States, the owner may spend on average between $8,000 to $13,000. Pets may be kept for either nothing more than companionship or to also serve as working animals.

Pets in the workplace 
Pets have also gained more popularity in places of employment. Office pets are animals that live in or visit the workplace. Usually office pets belong to the company but may also be the personal pet of the CEO or owner, office manager, or another employee. In addition to office pets, there are also Pet-friendly work environments, where employees can bring their pets from home to work with them. 

The practice of having office pets and/or pet-friendly work environments has been known to occur in big businesses, medium-sized businesses, and small businesses. Reasons as to why a business would have an office pet include boosting employee moral, reducing stress and improving health, drawing in and recruiting new employees, improving communication and collaboration between coworkers, attracting customers and clients, and improving public relations between the business and the community. Additionally, business leaders have cited multiple advantages to having pet-friendly work environments such as improving company culture, boosting productivity, reducing employee turnover, boosting employer brand, improving employee satisfaction, boosting the mental and physical health of workers and giving employees more flexibility.

Popular pets in the United States

Dogs 

In the United States, the estimate of households that have dogs as pet is about 69 million. Nowadays, owners that have dogs have considered them their best friend and a part of their family. Owners that have suffered from mental illness, loneliness, and distress have lightly eased with the help of their dogs. Human and dog relationships have now been more emotional than practical. In the past, humans owned dogs for work purpose. Small dogs were used to scare off pest, while larger dogs were used for protection and identify danger. Other important jobs that people have used dogs to preform include, among other things, hunting for game, search and rescue for missing persons, herding of livestock and serving as therapy dogs for people.

Cats 

In the United States, there is an estimate of 45.3 million households that own a cat. In the past, humans owned cats for work purpose. The most common job for cats is killing or scaring off vermin such as pigeons and rodents. Additionally cats (particularly puppy cats) have also been used as protection animals for their owners. Another job cats have been known to preform for humans, is serving as therapy cats for people. Between cats and dogs, cats have been known to be the opposite of how dogs act. Cats are seen to be more independent and tend to themselves. Many believe that cats are only with humans for their own benefits, such as eating. Nowadays, this idea has changed as cats are known to change their performance based on how their owners act towards them. The type of cat, character, and its history impacts their behavior.

Rodents 
In the United States, there is an estimate of 5.3 million households that have rodents as pets. Additionally rats have also been used for work purpose as well such as bomb detection, laying computer link cables or serving as therapy animals for people. In the past, rodents were considered vermin that spread disease and were a threat to crops, as a result the practice of keeping small mammals as pets, is a relatively recent development, arising only after large-scale industrialization.

Birds 
In the United States, there is an estimate of 6.0 million households that own birds. As with other domestic animals birds have been used to preform roles and tasks such as delivering messages, pigeon racing or falconry. Usually, ownership of birds requires an enclosure (such as a birdcages) or a tether (such as a jess) to keep the birds from getting loose.

Fishes 

In the United States, an estimate of 11.8 million households who own a pet, own a fish. Humans that rent homes that cannot own dogs and/or cats look towards the option to owning a fish. This could also be true to those who have a serious health issue or extreme asthma. Owning a fish has little evidence of allergies, and overall extreme little danger compared to owning dogs or cats. There are bacterial risks, such as infection, when it comes to fish water, but can be prevented with proper cleaning care. Those that do own a fish with an aquarium believe it has beneficial properties, such as relaxation and a distraction from everyday life.

Social cost of pet owning 
Pet owning in America may cause trouble to the public. Owners may have to face the consequences of pets that misbehave. It may result in pressure and distress to their owners and nearby neighbors. Each year in the United States alone, the Centers for Disease Control (CDC) found that an average of 4.5 million people are attacked by a dog. Within those attacks, around 900,000 of them are serious and need immediate attention. Many pets are also known to carry diseases. Dogs, one of the most common pets in America, are known to carry great numbers of rabies infection. Cats are carriers of Toxoplasma gondii, a parasite that enters the brain and may cause toxoplasmosis. Pets are also known to cause people allergies. They could also trigger an asthma attack, for those who are allergic.

See also
Pet culture in Japan
Pet culture in Korea
Pet industry
Pet ownership among the homeless
Self-domestication
List of domesticated animals
Backyard breeder
Leash
Animal training
Animal-assisted therapy
Classroom pet
Pet–friendly hotels
Pet-friendly dormitories

References

Pets
Culture